The sexual abuse scandal in Los Angeles archdiocese covered events that were documented beginning in the 1930s, but most publicity was related to events of the 1970s through 1990s. Priests accused of molesting children or adults in the parish were typically reassigned, without informing new parishes of charges against them, as the church protected its staff. Changes in policy took place, a dozen priests were dismissed in 2002, the church issued an apology and detailed report in 2004, and in 2007, the Archdiocese reached a settlement with 508 victims of $660 million, a recordbreaking amount. More lawsuits are expected when the California statute of limitations will be temporarily lifted on January 1, 2020.

Challenging aspects of investigations of sexual abuse
Although Cardinal Roger Mahony released a detailed report in 2004 on numerous cases of abuse in the archdiocese, he resisted releasing records on additional priests for which documentation had not been collected during investigation. Under his leadership, the Archdiocese appealed attempts by the Los Angeles County District Attorney to gain access to these church documents relating to sexual abuse all the way to the US Supreme Court. The Court refused to hear the appeal.

In 2006 the decision required the archdiocese to comply with a subpoena from the Los Angeles County District Attorney for letters to the former priests and notes from counseling sessions conducted by the church.

Settlement
In July 2007 the Los Angeles Archdiocese settled 508 cases for $660 million. On July 16, 2007, the day before he was to testify under oath, Mahony and the Roman Catholic Church in Los Angeles apologized for abuses by priests after 508 victims reached a record-breaking settlement worth $660m (£324m), with an average of $1.3m for each plaintiff. Mahony described the abuse as a "terrible sin and crime", as a series of trials into sex abuse claims since the 1940s were to begin. The agreement, if approved by a judge, will settle all 15 upcoming pedophilia trials against the Los Angeles archdiocese and avoids the threat of Mahony being forced to testify about how the Church dealt with abuses in the period from the 1940s to 1990s.

Since 2002 nearly 1,000 people have filed sexual abuse claims in California. The archdiocese agreed to pay out $60,000,000 to settle 45 lawsuits it still faces over two pending cases of sexual abuse. According to the Associated Press, a total of 22 priests were named in the settlement, with cases going as far back as the 1930s. 20 million dollars of this was paid by the insurers of the archdiocese.

Rita Milla
Rita Milla, an American citizen who was sexually abused by seven priests as a girl and young adult, was paid a $500,000 (€339,190) settlement on December 4, 2007, from the Roman Catholic Archdiocese of Los Angeles, as a result of her 23-year legal fight. Milla, 46, was one of the plaintiffs in a $660-million-dollar (€447.73 million) global settlement paid by the diocese reached for past abuse victims of molestation by priests. At 16, she was first abused by Fr. Santiago Tamayo at Los Angeles. She said the Roman Catholic Church's failure to help her caused her loss of faith: "It felt like God hanging up the phone on me. I'll never escape the memories and I'll always be fighting the after effects of the trauma I went through, but now I can work on healing." She sued the church in 1984, and Tamayo apologized to her in 1991. Tamayo, who died in 1999, was paid by the church to remain in the Philippines.

Effects on the diocese
On January 22, 2008, Tod Tamberg announced that the Roman Catholic Archdiocese of Los Angeles had sold its 12-story Archdiocesan Catholic Center on Wilshire Boulevard to Jamison Properties of Los Angeles for $31 million to raise funds to pay for its $660 million 2007 settlement on sex abuse by clergy. The building had been donated in 1995 by Thrifty PayLess.

2019 legal action
From May to December 2019, the Archdiocese of Los Angeles provided numerous documents to California State Attorney General Xavier Becerra in preparation for a series of pending lawsuits which are expected to be filed after a new California law which will temporarily remove the statute of limitations goes into effect on January 1, 2020. In January 2020, it was reported that the Archdiocese of Los Angeles had paid $1.9 million to settle a sexual abuse case against a former priest who served in the Archdiocese. In February 2020, a lawsuit was filed against not only the Archdiocese of Los Angeles, but also former Los Angeles ArchBishop Cardinal Roger Mahony and convicted ex priest Michael Baker.

RICO lawsuit 
On December 31, 2020, a RICO lawsuit was filed against the Archdiocese of Los Angeles which alleged that the Archdiocese was a "dumping ground" for clergy who were accused of committing acts of sexual abuse while serving in the Roman Catholic Diocese of Tucson. In March 2021, it was revealed that another plaintiff was added to the federal lawsuit, which had filed against both Dioceses.

See also
Child sexual abuse
Religious abuse
Sexual abuse
Sexual misconduct
Spiritual abuse
St. John's Seminary (California)

References

Crimes in Los Angeles
Los Angeles
Roman Catholic Archdiocese of Los Angeles
Incidents of violence against girls